Homer Roberts Spence (March 15, 1891 – July 1, 1973) was an Associate Justice of the California Supreme Court (1945-1960) and a justice of the District Court of Appeal, First District (1930-1945).

Biography
Spence was born on March 15, 1891, in San Francisco, California, and educated in the public schools, including Mastick Grammar School (class of 1904) and Alameda High School. In 1913, he graduated from Stanford University with a B.A. degree in pre-legal studies. He continued his studies at Stanford Law School, graduating in 1915 with a LL.B. degree, was admitted to the California bar, and entered private practice.

In 1920, Spence was elected as a Republican Assemblyman from Oakland's 35th district in the California State Assembly, and in January 1925 his name was considered for the position of speaker of the house. Afterwards, he served as private secretary to Governor C. C. Young, accompanying him on a fishing trip to the Yosemite Valley in June 1927. On October 3, 1927, when Spence was ready to depart the governor's office, Young appointed Spence to a seat on the Alameda County Superior Court. In September 1928, Spence ran unopposed and was elected to a new term on the superior court.

In March 1930, Governor Young elevated Spence to the Court of Appeal. In September 1930, during the next election, Spence successfully ran for a seat on the Court of Appeal, First District, with an unexpired term ending January 1933, winning over Frank Deasy, presiding judge of the San Francisco Municipal Court.

In December 1944, Governor Earl Warren appointed Spence as an associate justice of the California Supreme Court, and he began his term on January 2, 1945. Spence replaced Jesse W. Curtis Sr., who retired in December 1944. In November 1950, Spence successfully ran for re-election. While on the court, Spence was one of three Justices joining in dissent from the holding in Perez v. Sharp, in which the court held by a vote of 4 to 3 that interracial bans on marriage violated the Fourteenth Amendment to the United States Constitution and therefore were illegal in California. On June 1, 1960, Spence resigned from the high court and in his place Governor Pat Brown appointed Maurice T. Dooling Jr.

Spence died on July 1, 1973, in Oakland.

Personal life
On November 15, 1952, Spence married Frances Davie Horton, a widow in San Francisco.

References

External links
Homer R. Spence. California Supreme Court Historical Society.
 List of Past and Present Justices. California Court of Appeal, First District.
 Past & Present Justices. California State Courts. Retrieved July 19, 2017.

See also
 List of justices of the Supreme Court of California

1891 births
1973 deaths
Justices of the Supreme Court of California
Judges of the California Courts of Appeal
California state court judges
Stanford University trustees
Stanford University alumni
Stanford Law School alumni
Superior court judges in the United States
20th-century American judges
Lawyers from Oakland, California
Republican Party members of the California State Assembly
20th-century American politicians
20th-century American lawyers
20th-century American academics